The name Zane may be a given name or a surname. Its western usage derives from the Venetian form of Gianni or an alternate spelling of the German and Jewish name Zahn. An Arabic name Zain, Zayn, or as it is often anglicized Zane, is an Arabic personal name meaning "beauty, grace".  It was popularized as a given name in the early 20th century through the American writer Zane Grey. Zayne is an alternative spelling.

Notable people with the name Zane or Zayne include:

Given name

Zane
Zane Banks (born 1986), Australian guitarist 
Zane Beadles (born 1986), American football player
Zane Buzby, American actress
Zane Copeland (born 1982), American rapper better known as "Lil' Zane"
Zane Eglīte (born 1984), Latvian basketball player
Zayne Emory (born 1998), American actor
Zane Francis, Australian singer and Triple J Unearthed National Indigenous Winner at the National Indigenous Music Awards 2015
Zane Floyd (born 1976), American murderer
Zane Frazier (born 1966), American martial artist
Zane Gonzalez (born 1995), American football player
Zane Green (born 1996), Namibian cricketer
Zane Grey (1872–1939), American author
Zane C. Hodges (1932–2008), American pastor
Zane Holtz (born 1987), Canadian actor
Zane Huett (born 1997), American actor 
Zane Jākobsone (born 1985), Latvian basketball player
Zane Jordan (born 1991), Zambian swimmer
Zane Kirchner (born 1984), South African rugby player
Zane Lamprey (born 1976), American comedian and actor
Zane Lewis (born 1981), American painter
Zane Lowe (born 1973), New Zealand radio presenter
Zane McIntyre (born 1992), American ice hockey player
Zane Musa (1979–2015), American saxophonist
Zane Navratil (born 1995), a professional pickleball player
Zane Radcliffe (born 1969), British writer
Zane Reynosa (born 1975), American hip hop artist and fashion designer
Zane Robertson (born 1989), New Zealand runner
Zane Schwenk (born 1975), American wakeboarder
Zane Scotland (born 1982), British golfer
Zane Smith (born 1960), American baseball player
Zane Tamane (born 1983), Latvian basketball player
Zane Taylor (born 1988), American football player
Zane Tetavano (born 1990), Australian rugby league player
Zane Williams (born 1977), American country music singer
Zane Winslade (born 1983), New Zealand rugby player

Surname
 The pioneer Zane family in the United States, which includes:
 Robert Zane, English Quaker ancestor of P. Zane Grey, who came to the North American colonies in 1673
 Ebenezer Zane (1747–1811), American pioneer, founder of Zanesville Ohio
 Betty Zane (1759–1823), sister of Ebenezer
 Alex Zane (born 1979), British television and radio presenter
 Arnie Zane (1947–1988), American dancer and choreographer
 Billy Zane (born 1966), American actor
 Carolyn Zane (born 1958), American romance novelist
 Charles S. Zane (1831–1915), American judge and first chief justice of the Utah Supreme Court
 Clayton Zane (born 1977), Australian soccer player
 Frank Zane (born 1942), American bodybuilder and teacher
 Gheorghe Zane (1897–1978), Romanian economist 
 Joe Zane (born 1971), American artist
 John Maxcy Zane (1863–1937), American lawyer
 John Peder Zane (born 1962), American journalist
 Lisa Zane (born 1961), American actress
 Matt Zane (born 1974), American musician
 Matteo Zane (died 1605), Patriarch of Venice from 1600 to 1605
 Randolph Zane (1887–1918), American marine
 Raymond Zane (born 1939), American politician

Pseudonyms
 Zane (author) is a pseudonym of Kristina Laferne Roberts, author of erotic fiction novels

Characters
 Zane, from the animated TV series Ninjago
 Zane Bennett in the television series H2O: Just Add Water, played by Burgess Abernethy
 Zane Cobriana in The Kiesha'ra novels by Amelia Atwater-Rhodes
 Zane Donovan in the American television series Eureka
 Zane Park in Degrassi: The Next Generation
 Zane Truesdale in the Yu-Gi-Oh! GX anime and manga series
 Zane Yama in the Marvel Comics universe
 Zane Zaminski in the 1996 film The Arrival, played by Charlie Sheen
 Zane, the main character of On a Pale Horse by Piers Anthony
 Zane in The Uglies series of young adult novels by Scott Westerfeld
 Zane, in the television series K.C. Undercover
Zayne Carrick, in the Star Wars: Knights of the Old Republic comics
Zane, a Mistborn in the Brandon Sanderson novel Mistborn: The Well of Ascension

Related
 Zanesville (disambiguation)
 Zane's Trace
 Zane's Tracts

See also
Zane (disambiguation)
 Zain (disambiguation)
 Zayin

References 

English masculine given names